Osyozu-ike Dam is an earthfill dam located in Fukuoka Prefecture in Japan. The dam is used for irrigation. The catchment area of the dam is 3.6 km2. The dam impounds about 10  ha of land when full and can store 712 thousand cubic meters of water. The construction of the dam was  completed in 1969.

References

Dams in Fukuoka Prefecture
1969 establishments in Japan